The 2012 Missouri Western Griffons football team represented Missouri Western University during the 2012 NCAA Division II football season.

Schedule

References

Missouri Western
Missouri Western Griffons football seasons
Mid-America Intercollegiate Athletics Association football champion seasons
Missouri Western Griffons football